Independent School Batam is an international school located in Batam, Indonesia. It has pre-school, kindergarten, primary school, junior high school and senior high school. The school uses British International Curriculum and teaches students of various nationalities. The school was previously known as International School Batam.

References

External links

Batam
Schools in Indonesia
Education in the Riau Islands